Michael B. Natyshak (born November 29, 1963) is a Canadian former professional ice hockey player who played four games in the National Hockey League with the Quebec Nordiques during the 1987–88 season.

Career statistics

Regular season and playoffs

External links
 

1963 births
Living people
Bowling Green Falcons men's ice hockey players
Canadian ice hockey centres
Fort Wayne Komets players
Fredericton Express players
Ice hockey people from Ontario
National Hockey League supplemental draft picks
NCAA men's ice hockey national champions
People from Essex County, Ontario
Quebec Nordiques draft picks
Quebec Nordiques players